Seydili is a village in Silifke district of Mersin Province, Turkey. It is situated in the peneplane are to the west of Lamas River in the Taurus Mountains. The population of the village was 438 as of 2012. The main economic activities are farming and animal husbandry.

References

Villages in Silifke District